Penny Lake is a coin-shaped lake perched in moraine near the mouth of Roaring Valley, just south of Walcott Glacier in Victoria Land, Antarctica. It was the site of a base camp of the Victoria University of Wellington Antarctic Expedition (VUWAE), 1960–61, which gave this descriptive name.

Penny Lake was named by Ralph Hudson Wheeler, leader of the VUWAE, on account both of its near-perfect circular shape but also for Wheeler's wife, Penelope (Penny).

Lakes of Victoria Land
Scott Coast